Christopher Warnes is a South African academic based at the University of Cambridge. He is a University Senior Lecturer in English, a corresponding Lecturer in African Literatures and Cultures at the Cambridge Centre of African Studies, and a College Lecturer in English at St. John's College. He is the author of  Magical Realism and the Postcolonial Novel: Between Faith and Irreverence, (Palgrave Macmillan, 2009) and co-author, with Kim Anderson Sasser, of Magical Realism and Literature (Cambridge University Press, 2020).

References

Living people
Fellows of St John's College, Cambridge
Year of birth missing (living people)